Sheikh Hasina University is a government financed public university of Bangladesh. On 30 January 2017 in regular cabinet meeting, chaired by prime minister, agreed in principle to the Acts for the Sheikh Hasina University in Netrokona District. The initial plan was to set up a science and technology university in Netrokona, but it was later revised to a 'general' university, offering courses in arts, commerce other than science.
At present, there are a total of 53 public universities in the country..

List of vice-chancellors 
 Rafique Ullah Khan (2018-2022)
 Shubrta Kumer Aditya (In Charge)
 Golam Kabir (2022-present)

Academics

Faculties and departments
The university's 4 departments are organised into 3 faculties.

References

External links
 University Grants Commission of Bangladesh
 Bangladesh Bureau of Educational Information and Statistics

Public engineering universities of Bangladesh
Public universities of Bangladesh
Netrokona District